Thomas J. Lydon (June 3, 1927 – March 1, 2012) was a United States federal court judge.

Born in Portland, Maine, Lydon served in the United States Navy in 1945–1946. He then graduated from University of Maine and received his law degree from Georgetown University. Lydon was a Trial Judge for the United States Court of Claims from 1972–1982. In 1982, Lydon was reassigned by operation of law to the United States Court of Federal Claims.

Notes

External links 

1927 births
2012 deaths
Lawyers from Portland, Maine
University of Maine alumni
Military personnel from Maine
Judges of the United States Court of Federal Claims
United States Article I federal judges appointed by Ronald Reagan
20th-century American judges
Georgetown University Law Center alumni